Jamila Bey is an American journalist and public speaker. She was host of a weekly radio program The Sex, Politics And Religion Hour: SPAR With Jamila on Voice of Russia, and writes for The Washington Posts blog, She the People. Before working for the Washington Post and the Voice of Russia, Bey spent around a decade working as a producer and editor for National Public Radio, including for Morning Edition. She is African-American.

Bey is also an outspoken atheist, who has publicly stated that she believes religion to be actively detrimental to African-Americans, suggesting that religion both contributed to the physical enslavement of African Americans, and continues to contribute to their mental enslavement. She objects to the common characterization of the civil rights movement as a religious one, stating that although churches were significantly involved in the movement, "humans did all the work." A 2012 campaign by African Americans for Humanism placed billboards depicting Bey and other contemporary activists and organizers alongside historically prominent African American humanists Zora Neale Hurston, Langston Hughes, and Frederick Douglass.

In 2015 Bey became the first atheist activist to address the Conservative Political Action Conference’s annual meeting.

References

External links
  Spar With Jamila

Living people
African-American women journalists
African-American journalists
American expatriates in Russia
African-American atheists
American feminists
Atheist feminists
African-American feminists
American atheism activists
1976 births
Duquesne University alumni
Radio personalities from Pittsburgh
Journalists from Washington, D.C.
Journalists from Pennsylvania
21st-century atheists
African-American activists
21st-century American journalists
Date of birth missing (living people)
21st-century American women